The Ekityki is a stream located in Chukotka, in Far East Siberia. It belongs to the Chukotka Autonomous Okrug administrative region of Russia.

The easternmost remains of woolly rhinoceroses (Coelodonta antiquitatis) have been found in the Ekityki river basin.

Course
The Ekityki originates in the Chukotka Mountains. It makes its way eastwards through sparsely populated mountainous areas of the Eastern Siberian tundra. It flows across the Ekityki Lake into the left side of the Amguema in Central Chukotka. The Chantalvergyrgyn is a left tributary of the Ekityki.

Fauna
Salmon, whitefish, vendace, grayling, pike, rainbow herring (northwestern smelt), burbot, bull trout and loach are common in its waters.

See also
 List of rivers of Russia

References

 Geographic Location

Rivers of Chukotka Autonomous Okrug
Chukotka Mountains
Tributaries of the Amguema